The Oakridge School is a private school located in Arlington, Texas, US. It educates about 800 students in age groups Preschool-12.

History
The Oakridge School is a coeducational, college preparatory day school. A non-profit institution governed by an elected Board of Regents, the school has been accredited by the Independent Schools Association of the Southwest (ISAS) since 1988. It holds membership in the National Association of Independent Schools (1987) and is recognized by the Texas Education Agency (1982).

Oakridge formed when a group of parents, teachers, and administrators left the White Lake School of Fort Worth (K-3), which had been established in 1971 by Fort Worth businessman and city council member (1969–75) Ted Peters. The school community divided over proposed changes to the mission, specifically that students be tested for admissions and that students wear school uniforms. During the annual board of trustees meeting on February 27, 1979, parents expressed views on both sides of the issue, with board chair Nancy O'Shea and the school's new headmaster, the Episcopalian priest Father Peter C. Ensor, supporting progressive change. Controversy surrounding federally mandated busing added fuel to the fire. When the White Lake board replaced Nancy O'Shea with a new board chair and voted down proposed changes, O'Shea, Charles D. Butts, Jr., and other supporters drew up articles of incorporation for The Oakridge School within a week, as announced on March 6, 1979, at Woodhaven Country Club in east Fort Worth.

The Oakridge School opened at the Handley United Methodist Church, 2929 N. Forest Avenue, in east Fort Worth in August 1979 with 85 students and 15 faculty members under the leadership of headmaster Peter C. Ensor. Teaching assignments included one teacher per grade level (K4 thru grade 8), plus one teacher per subject for History, English, Science, Music, and Physical Education.

In 1980, the Board's Permanent Site Committee of Bill Pruitt, Nancy O'Shea, and James Shadle negotiated the purchase of 33 acres on Pioneer Parkway from dairy farmer Bruce Boswell of Arlington, who offered flexible financing for four years because, as Boswell said, "You will either be successful or fail in four years."

In 1981, the Board of Regents named Andy J. Broadus its second headmaster. Broadus had served as associate headmaster at Jacksonville Country Day School in Jacksonville, Florida. Enrollment quickly grew to 154 students.

The Texas Education Agency accredited Oakridge in 1982, the same year NAIS granted "new school status." While the school gained academic traction, it sought a permanent home. Upper School classes were held at a house on Meadowbrook Drive in 1981–1982. For three years, from 1982 to 1985, Oakridge operated at the old Handley Middle School, which was razed in the early 1990s.

Due to problems with the lease agreement with the Fort Worth Independent School District, and ongoing doubts as to the location of a permanent home, the Board of Regents purchased the 35 acres on the south side of Pioneer Parkway and started construction on the Early Childhood Center building in 1983. This, the first building on the Pioneer Parkway campus, was ready for students in the fall of 1984.

The year 1985 was a major turning point in the history of The Oakridge School. Its first class of seniors (7 members of the first alumni class) graduated in 1985. One of these pioneer members of the Oakridge Alumni Association came from the United Kingdom (Wales), beginning a tradition of enrolling international students that continues. To date, Oakridge students have enrolled from 24 different countries. In the Fall of 1985, Oakridge opened the Upper School Building at 5900 Pioneer Parkway.

With the 1986–87 school year, the school completed the move to the new campus with a new Lower School, Middle School, and Student Activity Center. In December 1987, the Southern Association of Colleges and Schools (SACS) accredited Oakridge. That same month, the NAIS granted the school full and active membership. Several months later (March 1988), Independent Schools Association of the Southwest accreditation followed suit. Among all ISAS members schools, Oakridge led with the greatest enrollment increase for the 1988–89 school year.

In September 1989, Oakridge started the Pre-school program for three-year-olds, making Oakridge the only ISAS school in the area with such a program. "It is never too soon to start laying a strong foundation," remarked one parent.

Headmaster Andy J. Broadus was named a Klingenstein Visiting Fellow at Columbia University's Teachers College in January 1992. By then, the school's debt had been reduced while plans were underway for expanding the Early Childhood Center (1993) and the construction of a new library and the Amon G. Carter Multipurpose Activity Center (1994). In September 1992 the National Merit Scholarship Corporation named Oakridge's first National Merit Scholar.

Oakridge successfully completed its first ten-year accreditation visit in 1997 with outstanding reviews by visiting teams from ISAS and SACS. This was followed by the launch of a $6 million capital campaign for the construction of a fine arts center and information center. An extension to the Lower School was completed that summer (1998). The new Information Center opened in December 1999, followed by the John P. Flavin Fine Arts Center in May 2000.

In 2006, the Boswell family—the same family who sold 33 acres to Oakridge in 1980—announced plans to sell 47.5 acres of property across the street on the north side of Pioneer Parkway. "We had always wanted the property," Mr. Broadus said, but the parcel belonged to several family members and could not be sold. After a real estate agent pieced the land together, Mr. Broadus was pleasantly surprised to see a for-sale sign. "That had to be ours," he said, especially in light of the fact that other Fort Worth sister schools had outgrown their space and had relocated to build new campuses. "That land meant [Oakridge] would never have to move."  The school acquired the additional land and set out to develop a master site plan for development into an athletic complex.

By 2007, the "Securing the Legacy" campaign had exceeded the $6 million goal. That September, the new Security Center was completed, the most expensive square footage ever developed by the school, due to the high technology needs of a secure campus.

Changes in leadership came in 2007 as well. Mr. Broadus, the longtime headmaster, stepped down from his role and assumed the title of president and chief fundraiser and developer for the Oakridge Athletic Complex. His associate headmaster, Jon Kellam, who had first come to Oakridge in 1993 and who had served as a soccer coach, English teacher, and Middle School head, stepped up to take over the management of the daily operations of the school. Mr. Kellam holds a master's from Texas Christian University, is an alumnus of Stanford University's Educational Leadership Institute, is a member of ISAS's Secondary Commission on Standards, and was selected as one of the 2014 Head of Schools fellows at the Klingenstein Center of Columbia University.

The 2011–12 school year saw various developments at Oakridge that impacted students across all divisions and in Academics, Arts, and Athletics. First, the new Quinn Family Kindergarten Center opened, creating four new K classrooms and almost doubling the Early Childhood Center to over 16,000 square feet. This state of the art facility was made possible by the philanthropy of William J. (Billy) and Stacey Quinn. The former Paradise Liquor store and gas station had been purchased and refitted for use as a 10,000 square foot Wrestling Center, with bathrooms and storage for the adjacent Duggan Track. In the realm of technology and public speaking, an Oakridge grandparent, Dr. Don Shelton, donated a short-range radio station: K-OWL AM 1670. After just a few months on the air, and streaming online, Oakridge Radio had listeners tuning in across 40 states and 13 countries.

The 2012–2013 school year featured another TEDx Youth Conference and two other developments: first, the Dubliners Colloquium for Upper School English students drew not only Oakridge students but those from eight other metroplex schools. Also, the Oakridge Athletic Complex opened the Tennis Complex with eight new, hard-surface courts. This allowed Tennis to be added to Middle School programs. Both the Track and Tennis courts are already serving the needs of many groups across the community, including the nearby Arlington Police Training Center.

In 2018-2019 Oakridge broke ground on new baseball and softball fields at the Oakridge Athletic Complex and received recognition among several online review resources. For the third year in a row, ArlingtonToday.com readers ranked Oakridge the top private school in Arlington. Among K-12 private schools across the nation, Niche ranked Oakridge in the top 13% nationally (296 of 2,213) and top 3.6% in DFW (14 of 382 private high schools). Oakridge continues to make such gains because, as one parent observed, Oakridge does not "mold" a certain type of student; instead, Oakridge encourages students to seek the best version of themselves.

Academics

The school includes students from age 3 to grade 12 in four divisions, each run by a division head. The Early Childhood Center includes pre-school, pre-Kindergarten, and Kindergarten. The Lower School includes elementary grades 1 thru 4. Middle School houses grades 5 thru 8, and Upper School incorporates the high school grades 9 thru 12. Each division head oversees the academic, arts, and athletic programs for the grade levels under their care.

The school's philosophy is to admit students who are a "good fit" for its programs and who are bound for college. Parents and children are encouraged to attend admissions events and to tour campus. After the introductions are made, Oakridge staff begin to gather academic and social information on each prospective student. "We do admissions testing and request report cards.... We require current teacher and principal recommendations, which address not only academic progress, but also the student's ability to get along with his or her peers, teachers, and others."

The Student and Exchange Visitor Program (SEVP) has authorized Oakridge to host international students from such countries as Brazil, Britain, Canada, China, France, Germany, Hong Kong (pre-1997), India, Indonesia, Iran, Japan, Jordan, Kenya, Lithuania, Malaysia, Mexico, Nigeria, the Philippines, Russia, South Korea, Spain, Taiwan, Thailand, Ukraine, and Vietnam. Each year, the school enrolls around 20 students from about a dozen countries.
  
Each year about half the senior class leaves the Lone Star state for college to such schools as University of Southern California, Vassar College, Northwestern University, Harvard University, New York University, Boston University, University of Virginia, University of Alabama, California Institute of the Arts, Rensselaer Polytechnic Institute, American University, Washington & Lee University, Washington University in St. Louis, and the University of St. Andrew's. The Upper School offers 23 AP courses.

Visual Art
Since 1985, high school juniors and seniors have participated in the Twelve County High School Art Competition, referencing twelve counties of north Texas now sponsored by the University of North Texas Health Science Center at Fort Worth. The annual Fort Worth Stock Show art competition entails a broader range of grades (1-12) and includes both private and public schools.

Choir & Orchestra
Beginning in the early 1980s, Oakridge music students performed in choral ensembles and in musical theater. Affiliation with the Texas Music Educators Association (TMEA), which involves over 12,000 school music educators, and the Texas Private School Music Educators Association (TPSMEA) has allowed many Oakridge music students to enjoy quality musical experiences in local, regional, and state competitions. On April 12, 1997, the A cappella choir joined with the University of Texas at Arlington A cappella choir, under the direction of Gary Ebensberger, and the New England Symphonic Ensemble performed Faure's "Requieum" at Carnegie Hall. Following the completion of a new John P. Flavin Fine Arts Center in 2001, Oakridge added chamber orchestra to its fine arts programs beginning in 2003-04 under the direction of the award-winning violinist Wendy Anuwe, a graduate of the Taipei National University of the Arts. Oakridge arts programs and faculty have long cultivated an appreciation for the arts and a lifetime involvement in music.

Drama/Theatre

Drama is an integral part of the Fine Arts experience at Oakridge, starting with Music & Movement in the Early Childhood Center and continuing with Lower School music, Lower School musical theater, and the 5th grade rotation of drama as well as choir, art, and string orchestra. Sixth graders take a semester long arts course, including either drama or art. Starting in 7th grade, students commit to a fine arts class for an entire school year. Drama and Musical Theater are options for Middle School, while Acting and Theatre Production are Upper School drama options. Each year, there is a large scale high school musical performed in the John Flavin Fine Arts Center's performance hall, which seats almost 400 audience members.

In the late 1990s, actress Betty Buckley helped found a local Tony Awards competition
to help promote high school drama programs. Oakridge students have garnered some of these awards.

Athletics

The school's sports teams are known as the Owls and compete in the Southwest Preparatory Conference (SPC) along with 16 other college preparatory schools primarily from Texas. Oakridge teams face a variety of schools, including public schools on occasion. Oakridge often competes against Texas Association of Private and Parochial Schools or TAPPS schools.

Students in grades 7 thru 12 can participate in as many as 16 different sports over three seasons during the school year. 
Fall season choices include: Football, Volleyball, Cross Country, Field Hockey, and Cheerleading; 
Winter season: Basketball, Soccer, Wrestling, Power Lifting, Swimming, and Equestrian; 
Spring: Baseball, Golf, Tennis, Track & Field, and Softball. Oakridge Owls regularly compete against other Southwest Preparatory Conference schools as Episcopal High School (Bellaire, Texas), St. Mark's School (Dallas, Texas), The Casady School (Norman, Oklahoma), and many others in Houston, Austin, San Antonio, Fort Worth, Dallas, Oklahoma City, and Tulsa, Oklahoma.

"They're just kids that we're developing, and they're learning it and figuring out the system," said Owls head baseball coach—and the Texas Rangers' 1984 rookie of the year--Curtis Wilkerson. "And they are getting better and better."

Notable alumni

 1996: JT Hodges, pop singer/country music performer; opened for Eric Church 
 1996: Marin P. Heiskell, Miss Teenage Texas
 1999: Eli Jordan, co-host of “Country Force” on 96.7FM/1310AM, The Ticket in Dallas-Fort Worth
 2003: Bruno Guarda, professional soccer player
 2006: Andre Akpan, professional soccer player 
 2006: William "Trip Lee" Barefield III, rapper
 2006: Lauren Goodwin, Economist and Director of Portfolio Strategy at New York Life Investments
 2008: Chris Babb, professional basketball player in the Israeli Basketball Premier League
 2010: Tayo Fabuluje, professional football player; drafted by the Chicago Bears in 2015

References

External links

Independent Schools Association of the Southwest
High schools in Arlington, Texas
Educational institutions established in 1979
Private K-12 schools in Texas
Preparatory schools in Texas
1979 establishments in Texas